Ali Demi Street is a major street of Tirana, Albania. It is named after Ali Demi, a World War II hero. It is an important central street of eastern Tirana and branches off the Bajram Curri Boulevard. Several universities and colleges are located along this street. In this street is located the Ministry of Foreign Affairs.

References

Streets in Tirana